The following is a list of notable deaths in October 1966.

Entries for each day are listed alphabetically by surname. A typical entry lists information in the following sequence:
 Name, age, country of citizenship at birth, subsequent country of citizenship (if applicable), reason for notability, cause of death (if known), and reference.

October 1966

1 
 Michael "Trigger Mike" Coppola, American mobster (b. 1900)
 Donald S. Day, American reporter and collaborator with Nazi Germany (b. 1895)
 Cyril Dumpleton, British politician, MP (b. 1897)
 Germaine Lecomte, French fashion designer (b. 1889)
 Kenneth Mackenzie, British cleric, Bishop of Brechin (b. 1876)

2 
 Egmont Arens, American publisher of literature and art, industrial designer, and commercial artist (b. 1889)
 Jules Boedt, Belgian lawyer and politician (b. 1884)
 Jumbo Brown, American baseball player (b. 1907)
 Anna Lesznai, Hungarian-born American artist and writer (b. 1995)

3 
 George van den Bergh, Dutch law professor and amateur astronomer (b. 1890)
 Teodors Bergs, Latvian chess master (b. 1902)
 Raymond Evershed, 1st Baron Evershed, English judge (b. 1899)
 Ivy Gibbs, English-born Australian and New Zealand writer (b. c. 1886)
 Charles Hand, Hong Kong-born Australian politician, member of the Tasmanian House of Assembly (b. 1900)
 George Heinz, Australian rules footballer (b. 1891)
 Dave Lambert, American jazz singer (b. 1917)

4 
 Sherman Billingsley, American nightclub owner (the Stork Club) (b. 1896)
 Oscar Cox, American lawyer and judge (b. 1905)
 Pierre Dufaur de Gavardie, French flying ace of World War I (b. 1890)
 Herbert Henley, Australian politician, member of the New South Wales Legislative Council (b. 1889)
 Frederick Jamieson, Canadian politician, member of the Legislative Assembly of Alberta (b. 1875)
Mike Tresh, American baseball player (b. 1914), cancer.

5 
 Korbinian Aigner, known as Apfelpfarrer ("apple pastor"), German Catholic priest and pomologist (b. 1885)
 Hilda Sofie Kindt, Norwegian politician (b. 1881)

6 
 Sir George Abbiss OBE, British Chief Constable in the London Metropolitan Police (b. 1884)
 Sir Alexander Carr-Saunders, English academic, Director of the London School of Economics (b. 1886)
 Pierre Couderc, French screenwriter and actor (b. 1896)
 Mitchell Fields, Romanian-born American sculptor (b. 1901)
 Harry Hanson, American baseball player (b. 1896)
 Eddie Harris, Australian rules footballer (b. 1879)
 Bill Henderson, American baseball player (b. 1901)

7 
 Grigoris Asikis, Greek singer and songwriter of urban Greek music (b. 1890)
 John Haire, Baron Haire of Whiteabbey, British politician, MP (b. 1908)
 Mauritz Johansson, Swedish sport shooter who competed in the 1924 Summer Olympics (b. 1881)
 Johnny Kidd, English singer (b. 1935)
 Smiley Lewis, African-American R&B musician (b. 1913)
 George Magerkurth, American baseball umpire (b. 1888)

8 
 Juan Batlle Planas, Spanish-born Argentine painter (b. 1911)
 Célestin Freinet, French educational reformer (b. 1896)

9 
 Fedor Astakhov, Soviet Marshal of the aviation (b. 1892)
 William Gage Brady, Jr., American banker, chairman of the National City Bank of New York (b. 1887)
 Leslie Irvin, American parachutist and stuntman (b. 1895)
 Franz Xaver Kappus, Austrian-German writer (b. 1883)
 Artturi Lehtinen, Finnish diplomat, ambassador to Canada (b. 1896)

10 
 Melville E. Abrams, American lawyer and politician from New York; member of the NY State Assembly (b. 1912)
 Abraham Binder, American composer (b. 1895)
 Kurt Bolender, German SS-man, operated the gas chambers at Sobibór(b. 1912)
 Colette Bonheur, née Colette Chailler, Canadian singer (b. 1927)
 Charlotte Cooper, English tennis champion (b. 1870)
 Robert Desoille, French psychotherapist (b. 1890)
 Vladimir Dyomin, Soviet footballer and coach (b. 1921)
 Jack Ferguson, Australian rules footballer (b. 1901)
 Wilfrid Lawson, English actor (b. 1900)
 Patsy Gharrity, American baseball player (b. 1892)
 William Wells Hewitt, English-Canadian organist and composer (b. 1898)
 Wilfrid Lawson, English actor (b. 1900)
 Slip Madigan, American football player and coach (b. 1896)

11 
 Mabel Conkling, American sculptor (b. 1871)
 Wunibald Kamm, Swiss-born German automobile designer (b. 1893)
 Roger Sherman Loomis, American academic (b. 1887)
 Jack Loutet, Scottish-born Canadian politician, member of the Legislative Assembly of British Columbia (b. 1885)
 Filipe Samuel Magaia, Mozambican politician and guerrilla leader (b. 1937)
 Osbert Peake, 1st Viscount Ingleby, British Conservative Party politician (b. 1897)

12 
 Venerable Sergio Bernardini, Italian layman beatified by Pope Francis (b. 1882)
 Arthur Lourié, Russian composer (b. 1892)

13 
 Muhammad Ibrahim, Pakistani academic, judge, and Minister of Law (b. 1894)
 Thom de Klerk, Dutch musician (b. 1912)
 Gijs Lamoree, Dutch athlete, competed at the 1928 Summer Olympics (b. 1903)
 Maj. Gen. Walter E. Lauer, American commander during World War II (b. 1893)
 Clifton Webb, American actor (b. 1889)

14 
 George Carstairs, Australian rugby player (b. 1900)
 Arthur Folwell, English-born Australian rugby player (b. 1904)
 Roswell Clifton Gibbs, American physicist and academic (b. 1878)

15 
 Frederick Montague, 1st Baron Amwell CBE, British Labour Party politician (b. 1876)
 Jon Andrå, Norwegian Labour Party politician (b. 1888)
 Lee Blair, American jazz musician (b. 1903)
 Adam Falkenstein, German Assyriologist (b. 1906)
 Ross Gunn, American physicist (b. 1897)
 Jean Lauk, French cyclist (b. 1918)

16 
 Arturo Dazzi, Italian artist (b. 1881)
 George O'Hara, American actor (b. 1899)

17 
 Dalziel Hammick, British chemist (b. 1887)
 Sidney Hatch, American athlete, silver medalist at the 1904 Summer Olympics (b. 1883)
 Dhammalok Mahasthavir, Nepalese Buddhist monk (b. 1890) 
 Vladislav Korchits, Polish-Soviet general and politician (b. 1893)
 Alexander Kulik, Russian cleric (b. 1911)

18 
 Elizabeth Arden, Canadian-born beautician and cosmetics entrepreneur (b. 1878)
 Cyril Briggs, Nevis-born American Communist Party leader (b. 1888)
 Joe Chandler, Australian rules footballer (b. 1877)
 Honor Crowley, Irish politician, TD (b. 1903)
 S. S. Kresge, American businessman, founder of Kmart (b. 1867)

19 
 Scott Leavitt, American politician, U.S. Representative from Montana (b. 1879)
 Waldo Gifford Leland, American historian and archivist (b. 1879)
 Russell Lewis American football coach (b. 1895)

20 
 Harry F. Byrd, American politician, Senator from Virginia (b. 1887)
 Sir Roy Cameron, Australian pathologist, President of the Royal College of Pathologists (b. 1899)
 Charles Catteau, French industrial designer (b. 1880)
 Walter Chadwick, English footballer (b. 1903)
 Mohamed Fawzi, Egyptian composer and singer (b. 1918)

21 
 Alfred Cockayne, New Zealand botanist (b. 1880)
 Lewis Cohen, Baron Cohen of Brighton, British politician (b. 1897)
 Gen. Otto von Knobelsdorff, German general during World War II (b. 1886)
 Agnes Syme Macdonald, Scottish suffragist (b. 1882)

22 
 George E. Drach, American lawyer and politician (b. 1906)
 Jack Evans, Australian rules footballer (b. 1891)
 John Garrick, British actor (b. 1902)
 P. S. Harrison, Ottoman-born American journalist (b. 1880)

23 
 Eugenio Bava, Italian cinematographer (b. 1886)
 George Bell, Australian painter (b. 1878)
 Fred Fussell, American baseball player (b. 1895)
 Rafael Larco Hoyle, Peruvian archaeologist (b. 1901)
 Claire McDowell, silent screen actress (b. 1877)

24 
 Joe Bach, American football player (Notre Dame) and coach (Pittsburgh Steelers) (b. 1901)
 Hans Dreier, German-born American art director (b. 1885)
 Leo Friedlander, American sculptor (b. 1888)
 Sam Hardy, English footballer (b. 1882)
 Norman R. Klug, American politician, member of the Wisconsin State Assembly (b. 1905)

25 
 Reginald Crummack, British field hockey player, competed at 1920 Summer Olympics (b. 1887)
 Floyd MacMillan Davis, American artist (b. 1896)
 Col. William O. Eareckson, American Air Force officer (b. 1900)
 Johan Helo, Finnish politician and diplomat, Minister of Finance and ambassador to France (b. 1889)
 Thaddeus Lynch, Irish politician, TD (b. 1901)

26 
 Katyayanidas Bhattacharya, Indian philosopher (b. 1917)
 Alma Cogan, English singer (b. 1932)
 Sir James Coats, 3rd Baronet, British skeleton racer, competed at the 1948 Winter Olympics (b. 1894)
 Bill Cronin, American baseball player (b. 1902)

27 
 Mush Crawford, American football player (b. 1898)
 Malcolm Dobie, American-born Canadian politician, Member of the Legislative Assembly of Saskatchewan (b. 1885)
 Barry Faulkner, American artist (b. 1881)
 Nigel Haig, English cricketer (b. 1887)
 Peter Harvey, English cricketer (b. 1926)
 Hewlett Johnson, English Anglican priest, Dean of Canterbury (b. 1874)
 Edith Kiss, Hungarian sculptor (b. 1905)

28 
 Nikolai Belyaev, Soviet politician, Secretary of the Central Committee of the Communist Party of the Soviet Union (b. 1903)
 Robert Charpentier, French Olympic cyclist (b. 1916)
 Eugène Hénaff, French trade union leader and member of the French Resistance (b. 1904)
 Franz Herterich, German actor (b. 1877)

29 
 Wellman Braud, American jazz musician (b. 1891)
 Thomas Brennan, Australian politician, Victorian MLC (b. 1900)
 Jocelyn Brooke, English author (b. 1908)
 Anthony Cavalcante, American politician, United States Representative for Pennsylvania (b. 1897)
 Al Grabowski, American baseball player (b. 1901)
 Peter Illing, Austrian-born British actor (b. 1899)

30 
 Dick Barrett, American baseball MLB pitcher (b. 1906)
 Rex Cecil, American baseball player (b. 1916)
 John Drainie, Canadian actor and television presenter (b. 1916)
 Bill Farnsworth, Australian rugby player (b. 1887)
 Elmer Johnson, American baseball player (b. 1884)

31 
 Elsie Leslie (b. 1881)

References

1966-10
October 1966 events